Mathematical challenges generally refer to more basic mathematics such as that experienced in elementary or junior high school, but can extend to any realm of the study.  It is commonly accepted that mathematics is a difficult area of study. Even so, it is generally agreed that the difficulty experienced when one attempts to master a topic leads to meaningful, long lasting, rewards.  There is a long list of mathematics competitions throughout the world.

Professional context
There are a number of problems in pure mathematics with a cash prize offered for a successful solution. Often the problems are thought of as relevant areas of study in modern mathematical research. One example of such a mathematical challenge is the Riemann hypothesis which is currently an unsolved problem. A proof or disproof of this would have far-reaching implications in number theory, especially for the distribution of prime numbers.

There are several professional organizations that collect various unsolved math problems and present them as mathematical challenges.  Some collections are the:

 Millennium Prize Problems
 Certicom ECC Challenge
 RSA Factoring Challenge (no longer active)
 New York City deli worker’s Math Challenges go Viral
 
Mathematical Challenge can also refer to:
 United Kingdom Mathematical Challenges

Mathematics education